Akiha may refer to:

Mount Akiha, mountain in Shizuoka Prefecture, Japan
Akiha-ku, Niigata, ward of Niigata City, Niigata Prefecture, Japan